Heart of the World may refer to:

 Heart of the World (novel), an 1895 fantasy novel by H. Rider Haggard
 Heart of the World (1952 film), a West German drama film
 Heart of the World (2018 film), a Russian-Lithuanian drama film
 The Heart of the World, a 2000 short film made by Guy Madden for the Toronto Film Festival
 The Heart of the World (book), a 1990 book by Alan Ereira
 Hearts of the World, a 1918 wartime propaganda film directed by D. W. Griffith
 In the Heart of the World, the second album by singer Kelly Poon
 The Beast that Shouted Love at the Heart of the World, a collection of short stories by Harlan Ellison
 "The Beast that Shouted Love at the Heart of the World" (short story), the title story in the collection
 "Heart of the World", a song by Big Country (1990)
 Heart of the World, a song on Lady Antebellum's third studio album, Own the Night

See also 
 Heart (disambiguation)
 World (disambiguation)